The Egyptian magazine Maǧallat Kullīyat al-Ādāb bi-l-Ǧāmiʿat Fārūq al-Awwal (Arabic: مجلة كلية الآداب بالجامعة فاروق الأول; DMG: Maǧallat Kullīyat al-Ādāb bi-l-Ǧāmiʿat Fārūq al-Awwal; English: "Bulletin of the Faculty of Arts of the Farouk I University") was published as sequel of Maǧallat Kullīyat al-Ādāb bi-l-Ǧāmiʿa al-Miṣrīya between 1943 and 1972 at the Faculty of Arts of the Alexandria University. The Alexandria University, formerly known as Farouk I University, was founded as a department of the Cairo University in 1938.

A total of 11 volumes were published, which were usually released irregularly once a year. As with its sequel, which was published between 1933 and 1942 at the Cairo University, there was a division into an Arabic and a European part and thus the publication of articles in Arabic, English, and French. In terms of content, the magazine focused on historical events, numerous translations, the study of Arab scholars and their writings, philosophy, poetry, and ancient languages. Additionally, the journal specialised in various topics related to Egypt, such as history, culture, and social development.

References

External links

1943 establishments in Egypt
1972 disestablishments in Egypt
Alexandria University
Annual magazines
Arabic-language magazines
Defunct literary magazines published in Egypt
Magazines disestablished in 1972
Magazines established in 1943
Mass media in Alexandria